Aves Island is an island of the Andaman Islands. It belongs to the North and Middle Andaman administrative district, part of the Indian union territory of Andaman and Nicobar Islands.

History

Aves Lighthouse, was established in 2008.

Geography

Administration
Politically, Aves Island is part of Mayabunder Taluk.
The island is privately owned by the Co-op Society Ltd. plantation.

Transportation
Aves Island is about 20 mins ride away by Dinghy from Mayabunder jetty.

Demographics 
There is only 1 village.  
According to the 2011 census of India, the Island has 1 households. The effective literacy rate (i.e. the literacy rate of population excluding children aged 6 and below) is 100%.

The residents are farmers growing Paddy, vegetables, coconuts, horticultural crops, spices.

References 

 Geological Survey of India

Cities and towns in North and Middle Andaman district
Islands of North and Middle Andaman district
Tourist attractions in the Andaman and Nicobar Islands
Private islands of India
Islands of India
Populated places in India
Islands of the Bay of Bengal